The Bytches is the 1991 debut album by American female rap duo BWP. The album was released on February 19, 1991, by Columbia Records and was produced by Mark Sexx. The Bytches peaked at number 34 on the Billboard Top R&B/Hip-Hop Albums chart and features the single, "Two Minute Brother", which reached number six on the Hot Rap Singles chart. This was the only album released by the group, as their follow-up, Life's a Bytch, was shelved just days before its release in 1993.

Track listing
"Comin' Back Strapped" – 6:13
"Wanted" – 5:31
"Cotex" – 4:53
"Is the Pussy Still Good?" – 6:22
"Two Minute Brother" – 5:12
"Fuck a Man" – 6:16
"A Different Category" – 4:01
"Shit Popper" – 5:10
"We Want Money" – 3:39
"No Means No" – 3:48
"Hit Man" – 4:38
"Teach 'Em" – 4:24

References

1991 debut albums
BWP (group) albums
Columbia Records albums